Edward Whitley may refer to:

 Edward Whitley (environmentalist), British industrialist, environmentalist and philanthropist
 Edward Whitley (politician) (1825–1892), English solicitor and Conservative Member of Parliament